Mount Coates is a peak,  high, just south of Mount Lawrence in the David Range of the Framnes Mountains. It was discovered and named in February 1931 by the British Australian New Zealand Antarctic Research Expedition under Mawson.

References
 

Mountains of Mac. Robertson Land